is one of the seven wards of the city of Hamamatsu, Shizuoka Prefecture, Japan. It is bordered by Tenryū-ku, Higashi-ku, Naka-ku and the city of Iwata. The Tenryū River and the Akaishi Mountains form natural boundaries for the ward.

Hamakita Ward was established on April 1, 2007. As of 2009, it had a population of 90,817 persons in an area of 66.51 km², with a population density of 1370 persons per km².

Transportation

Railroads 
Central Station: Hamakita Station
 Enshū Railway
  -  -  - -  -  
 Tenryū Hamanako Railroad
  -

Bus

National Route

Prefectural Route

Government

Hamakita Ward Office
The ward office is located at 6 Nishimisono. The hall is split into north and south halls and the south hall was previously used as Kitahama Village Hall. The north hall was built as a result of five municipalities merged to form the town of Hamakita and later become the city of Hamakita.

Districts within Hamakita Ward

Hamana District (浜名地区)

Hamakita District (北浜地区)

Nakase District (中瀬地区)

Akasa District (赤佐地区)

Aratama District (麁玉地区)

External links

 浜松市浜北区 

Wards of Hamamatsu